Nová Polhora is a village and municipality in Košice-okolie District in the Kosice Region of eastern Slovakia.

History
In municipality, it is a relatively new establishment, created in 1954.

Geography
The village lies at an altitude of 220 metres and covers an area of 2.077 km².

Population
Nová Polhora had an estimated population of 452 people in 2016.
Approximately half of the population is Slovak in ethnicity, the other half is Magyar.

Culture
The village has a public library, football ground, and a restaurant.

References

External links

Villages and municipalities in Košice-okolie District
Šariš